Xie Zhiwei (born 7 January 1998) is a Chinese footballer currently playing as a midfielder for Jiangsu Suning.

Club career
Xie Zhiwei would make his debut for Jiangsu Suning on 23 November 2019 in a league game against Beijing Renhe F.C. that ended in a 3–2 victory. The following season he would be a squad player that won the 2020 Chinese Super League title with them.

Career statistics
.

Honours

Club
Jiangsu Suning
Chinese Super League: 2020

References

External links

1998 births
Living people
Chinese footballers
Association football midfielders
Chinese Super League players
Jiangsu F.C. players
Beijing Sport University F.C. players